300 East Pratt Street is a proposed skyscraper in Baltimore, Maryland. The building, originally expected to rise , is current on hold due to high vacancy rates in the city. Construction of the building was to begin in 2007 and was originally expected to be completed in 2010.
The construction of this building was proposed in 2003, though, it was never approved by the state of Maryland. In 2006, the construction of the building was again proposed, and finally approved by the state of Maryland. The building is being built where the Hearst Production Building once stood. Plans are now scaled back to 40 stories and 300,000 square feet of office space, in addition to a 270-room hotel. 300 East Pratt Street is located in Baltimore, MD between Commerce and South streets, housed the former Baltimore News-American building. It has been vacant and used for a parking lot for decades. However, parking lot owner InterPark LLC purchased the site in August 2013 after a redevelopment plan proposed by Urban America LP in 2006 fell apart during the recession. As of January 2022, MCB Real Estate LLC owns and is developing the property. No further plans or details have been provided at this time.

History
The property, which has been used as a parking lot since the News American building was razed in 1990. The property has gone through two previous owners, and plans were floated for offices, hotels and condominiums but never realized. Then in 2013, InterPark, a Chicago-based developer and parking garage operator, bought the site for $16.4 million and requested bids from developers. Chicago-based InterPark Holdings tapped Comstock Partners in 2014 as a development partner on the project, and Comstock started working with the firm.  However, Comstock stepped away from the project around the beginning of that year. The project was expected to break ground in 2016.

Construction architecture
The constructions include feature sleek cladding of this millennium and tall, slender proportions that will drastically improve Baltimore's skyline. At 48 stories respectively, 300 E. Pratt will likely rise over 500 feet. The proposal for 300 E. Pratt St. from InterPark LLC and Comstock Partners calls for a building that would rise at least 38 stories, or about 425 feet, making it among the tallest in the city. It would include a hotel with 200 rooms, about 400 apartments, at least 500 parking spaces and up to 20,000 square feet of retail space. The apartments will be a mix of one, two and three-bedroom units and will have their own lobby, separate from the hotel. However, there were some concerns from the panel members that the building — which as designed would devote much of its first floor to parking, service and mechanical uses with retail on Pratt Street — could contribute to the disconnect between the central business district and the Inner Harbor. In order to meet new flood-plain requirements that the building's entrances be 8 feet off the ground in case of flooding during a major storm, Comstock Partners had to shrink the project's footprint, sacrificing about 10,000 square feet of retail space. Designers made the steps lower, wider and terraced, leaving wide stoops that invite pedestrians to sit and look out on Pratt Street.

Environment and setting
300 East Pratt Street is in downtown located between Commerce and South Streets near the heart of Baltimore, Inner Harbor. It sits along the north side of Pratt Street, almost directly north of the Baltimore World Trade Center.

See also
List of tallest buildings in Baltimore

References

Buildings and structures under construction in the United States
Downtown Baltimore
Hotels in Maryland
Skyscrapers in Baltimore